M149 may refer to:

 M-149 (Michigan highway)
 M149 (Cape Town), a Metropolitan Route in Cape Town, South Africa